The Stripping of the Altars: Traditional Religion in England, 1400–1580 is a work of history written by Eamon Duffy and published in 1992 by Yale University Press.  It received the Longman-History Today Book of the Year Award.

Summary of the book's argument
In the Preface to the second edition, Duffy says, "[t]he book was thus intended as a contribution towards a reassessment of the popularity and durability of late medieval religious attitudes and perceptions..."   

While its title suggests a focus on iconoclasm, with an allusion to the ceremony of stripping the Altar of its ornaments in preparation for Good Friday, its concerns are broader, dealing with the shift in religious sensibilities in English society between 1400 and 1580. In particular, the book is concerned with establishing, in intricate detail, the religious beliefs and practices of English society in the century or so preceding the reign of Henry VIII.

Prior to the 1980s, academic consensus seemed to be that the English Reformation was a response to an immoral clergy and an ineffective institutional Church. Sometimes referred to as "the Whig version", this view held that prior to the Reformation, the English church was corrupt, full of superstition, and long-overdue for reform. This was the view presented by A. G. Dickens, whose 1964 English Reformation was, for many years the standard text on the subject. The main thesis of Duffy's book is that the Roman Catholic faith was in rude and lively health prior to the English Reformation. Duffy's argument was written as a counterpoint to the prevailing historical belief that the Roman Catholic faith in England was a decaying force, theologically spent and unable to provide sufficient spiritual sustenance for the population at large.

Part I
Duffy’s work contains an abundance of primary sources. Taking a broad range of evidence (accounts, wills, primers, memoirs, rood screens, stained glass, joke-books, graffiti, etc.), Duffy argues that every aspect of religious life prior to the Reformation was undertaken with well-meaning piety. Duffy focuses on how the liturgical calendar, with its fasts and festivals, shaped believers' "perception of the world and their place in it."
Pre-Reformation Catholicism was, he argues, a deeply popular religion, practised by all sections of society, whether noble or peasant. A key point that Duffy makes is that there is no substantial difference between the beliefs and practices of the clergy and the elite and that of the masses. He effectively refutes Jean Delumeau's contention that there was any significant distinction between the religion of the educated elite and of the illiterate populace. Earlier historians’ claims that English religious practice was becoming more individualised (with different strata of society having radically different religious lives) is contested by Duffy insisting on the continuing ‘corporate’ nature of the late medieval Catholic Church, i.e. where all members were consciously and willingly part of a single institution.

Part II
The second part of Duffy's book concentrates on the accelerated implementation of Protestantism in the mid sixteenth century. It charts how society reacted to Henrician, Edwardian and Elizabethan reform and the changes in religious practice this entailed. Duffy uncovers a succession of records, notes and images that individually reveal an assortment of changes to liturgy and custom but taken together build up to demonstrate a colossal change in English religious practice.

It was a painful process for Catholics, and Duffy vividly illustrates the confusion and disappointment of Catholics stripped of their familiar spiritual nourishment. (One of Duffy's later studies, The Voices of Morebath: Reformation and Rebellion in an English Village, focuses on how one particular Devon village reacted to these changes.)

Duffy also uses the second section to highlight the brief flame of optimism felt by Catholics ignited by the reign of the Catholic Mary from 1553 to 1558, a flame quickly extinguished by Mary's death. But ultimately, the Marian reign is a secondary issue. Duffy's narrative demonstrates how centuries of religious practice evaporated in the face of fierce centralist control.

David Siegenthaler, writing in the Anglican Theological Review said, "The importance of this book is that it affords opportunity to look broadly and comprehensively at the religious life of women and men before and after the separation from the Roman obedience and so take the measure of that life that in the continuum of English church history it can be noted and honored."

Duffy argues that the pre-Reformation Catholic Church was not as corrupt as some historians have believed. He also casts doubt on the belief that the Reformers performed valuable services by reviving a moribund church. If this interpretation is correct and if Anglican history needs re-examination, then, Eamon Duffy's book has important ramifications in the area of ecumenism.

A second edition was released in 2005, for which Duffy wrote a new Preface reflecting on recent developments in understanding the period. A third edition, released in 2022, contains both the second edition's Preface and a newer one in which Duffy details how the book came to be and responds to certain criticisms of its contents.

Critical reception

Upon its publication, the book was hailed by many as original and persuasive account of English Catholicism in the Late Middle Ages. Writing in the New York Review of Books, British historian Maurice Keen stated, Perhaps it takes an Irishman to offer Englishmen (and others) a convincing picture of the religion of the ordinary lay people of England in the age before the Reformation. ...The evocation of [medieval Roman Catholicism,] that older, pre-Reformation tradition and of what its observances meant to the laity of its time is the theme of the first part of Dr. Duffy's deeply imaginative, movingly written, and splendidly illustrated study.

Robert Ombres OP, writing in Moreana said, "Duffy's book is in every sense a substantial achievement. It is lengthy, carefully argued and researched..."

Others expressed a more ambivalent attitude. Writing in the London Review of Books, Susan Brigden praised the first part of the book as a "splendid achievement" despite occasional instances of "special pleading" in favor of late medieval Catholicism. Regarding the second half of the book covering the Reformation, however, Brigden was more critical: "with the advance of reform Duffy is hardly concerned. The power and, for many, the truth of the central doctrines of Protestantism are never admitted; nor are the spiritual doubts that assailed many Catholics."

In a review of the second edition, The Atlantic's literary editor, Benjamin Schwarz, called it  [A] vigorous and eloquent book, a work of daring revision and a masterpiece of the historical imagination.... At once meticulous and lush, The Stripping of the Altars patiently and systematically recovers the lost world of medieval English Catholicism. ...[W]hile the first two-thirds of this book is a deeply textured work of historical anthropology, the last third is a gripping narrative history, as Duffy traces the way the English Reformation (a process supported by a tiny minority, and deeply if ineffectively opposed by a population cowed by the new and crushing force of the monarchy) eradicated a thousand years of tradition and ritual. ... Duffy's most significant contribution by far is to elucidate the fragility of even deeply rooted ways of life: he convincingly demonstrates that for better or worse, the Reformation was "a great cultural hiatus, which had dug a ditch, deep and dividing, between the English people and their past"—a past that over merely three generations became a distant world, impossible for them to look back on as their own.

Unlike Schwarz, however, Robald Hutton and W. Brown Patterson found Duffy's narrative of the Reformation unconvincing. Ronald Hutton criticised Duffy's neglect of unpublished sources and his 'selective blindness in his treatment of colleagues and sources'.

Similarly, W. Brown Patterson asked, "If late medieval religion was as vigorous as Duffy maintains, why did the English Reformation occur? The answer he gives is that Henry VIII's breach with Rome was politically inspired and was aimed at resolving his matrimonial difficulties. But, if this was so, how and why did England become Protestant and, eventually Anglican?"

References

Further reading
 online edition

1992 non-fiction books
20th-century history books
History books about England
History books about Christianity
Books about Christianity
Yale University Press books
English Reformation
Catholic Church in England and Wales